SS Donau was an Passenger and Cargo Vessel owned by Norddeutscher Lloyd. The ship was built by Caird & Company of Greenock, Scotland, in 1868 and served the Bremen-Baltimore line from January 16, 1869 until 1889 when she was sold. In 1895 she was destroyed by a fire in the North Atlantic while en route to Philadelphia. Everyone on board was rescued by the British steam ship Delaware.

References 

1868 ships